Main Kuch Bhi Kar Sakti Hoon  (MKBKSH) or “I, A Woman, Can Achieve Anything” is an Indian trans-media (TV, radio, internet and mobile phone) edutainment (entertainment education) initiative launched by the Population Foundation of India (PFI) to challenge the prevailing social and cultural norms around family planning, early marriage, early and repeated pregnancies, contraceptive use, domestic violence and sex selection. Award-winning actor / director, Feroz Abbas Khan is the creator of the show.
The show has been endorsed by several celebrities involved with advocating social causes. These include Bollywood actors such as Sharmila Tagore, Shabana Azmi, Farhan Akhtar, Soha Ali Khan and corporate leaders such as Naina Lal Kidwai, among others. In season 2, Farhan Akhtar makes a special appearance in the episodes as a ‘Sutradhar’ or narrator, in addition to a collaboration with his organization MARD (Men against Rape and Discrimination), a social initiative launched by the actor.

Plot 

‘Main Kuch Bhi Kar Sakti Hoon’ is a powerful example of the ability of a woman to break free from the shackles of a patriarchal society and prove her mettle. Set in the small imaginary town of Pratappur, season 1 consists of 52 episodes revolving around the inspiring journey of Dr. Sneha Mathur, a young doctor who leaves behind her lucrative career in Mumbai to work in Pratappur. Sneha’s sense of family responsibility, along with her ability to respond to challenges makes her a role model for many young Indian women who face similar realities. Sneha comes across a child widow named Meethi, who has influenced her with the struggles and hence Sneha adopts her. The adopted widow is then given a formal education, a good standard of living and social support. The series was scripted to influence social norms and behaviours on sex-selection, child marriage, age of first pregnancy, spacing between pregnancies, quality of healthcare, and domestic violence.

In season 2, comprising 79 episodes, Dr. Sneha continues her crusade to ensure that the finest quality of healthcare is accessible to everyone. The season has a special focus on youth and addresses the issues of adolescents. Each issue is addressed in a drama format. Dr. Sneha’s younger sister starts a football team. Meethi chooses to become a football player as it is a very selective gender game. It shows various issues faced by Preeta. Her family has shown good support to their daughters.

Telecast 
An estimated 58 million viewers watched season 1 on DD National, the national public broadcaster and one of the largest TV networks reaching the remotest areas in India. The show had total of 52 episodes in season 1 and was telecast in West Asia, far East, Canada and Europe through DD India. The radio adaptation was broadcast on a total 155 channels covering primary Channels/Local Radio Stations, FM Stations and Vividh Bharati Stations across India through All India Radio (AIR). Additionally, they were aired through a few community radio stations in select states.

Season 2 of the series was aired in April 2015 and comprised 79 episodes. With the help of the National Adolescent Health programme, Population Foundation of India and the Ministry of Health and Family Welfare, it brought up various issues faced by adolescents through this edutainment series.

A unique feature of the TV series is the Interactive Voice Response Service (IVRS), which provided a discussion forum for viewers as also a platform to share feedback. IVRS received huge response with over 1.5 million telephone calls having been received between seasons 1 and 2 on a designated call-back number.

Achievements 
Season 1
With about 58 million viewers having watched season 1, the show had huge positive impact on the people. 
According to a survey carried out by Population Foundation of India after season 1 of the show, a total of 48% of the households watched the show in Bihar and Madhya Pradesh.
The awareness of Child Marriage Act had increased from 74% to 88% among the exposed groups and 85% from the non-exposed groups in Madhya Pradesh.
Bihar experienced an increase from 72% to 83% for exposed group and 78% for non-exposed group on the awareness of Child Marriage Act.
After watching the programme, 77% of the people understood the need of girls' education and that they should not be married before the age of 18.
Women became aware of family planning methods, thereby dropping the percentage of women who had never used any methods from 51% to 37.6%.
Only 25.4% women agreed to the fact that they should be beaten if they leave the house without their husband’s consent, compared to 47.8% before
Women who believed they are equal to men in terms of leaderships increased from 56.7% to 77.1%.
Girls too stood up for their right to education and against early marriage.
The show was appreciated by both men and women as the show runners received calls from 48% men and 52% women.

References

Women's rights in India